Scopula costata is a moth of the family Geometridae. It is found in Sri Lanka.

Description
It is a white moth irrorated (sprinkled) with fuscous. Frons fuscous. Base of collar fulvous. Forewings with a fulvous costal fascia. There is an indistinct antemedial slightly waved oblique fuscous line, and more oblique narrow medial and two postmedial bands. A cell-speck is present, with a marginal specks series, and an indistinct marginal band. Hindwings with antemedial, postmedial, submarginal and marginal bands. Ventral side with fuscous suffusion in cell of forewings.

References

Moths described in 1887
costata
Taxa named by Frederic Moore
Moths of Sri Lanka